Maztek aka Matteo Cavo is a drum and bass neurofunk producer born in Rome, Italy. 
He began his career in 2004, after several releases on various independent record labels he was featured in 2012 on Renegade Hardware with his Single "Galactica/Odyssey".

In 2011, he became one of the official producers of Dope D.O.D., a hip hop crew based in the Netherlands, for which produces some beats one of which featuring Redman. In that same year he made a remix for an Italian band called Subsonica. The track was called "Il Diluvio (Maztek remix)" and was released by EMI.

In 2012 he signs his tune "Twang" on Hospital Records "Sick Music 3" followed by other Renegade Hardware various Artists releases and remixes.

In 2013 he signs his tune "Dizzy Step" on Program Records [Ram Records (UK)] Sub-label and "Hive Mind" on the Drum and Bass Arena Winter Selection 2013. In The same year he releases the "M Theory Ep" on Renegade Hardware.

Discography

Albums

Singles and EPs

Compilations

Production

References

External links

Maztek Discogs
Maztek Rolldabeats
Facebook

1981 births
Drum and bass musicians
Living people
Musicians from Rome